Rob Graves may also refer to:

 Rob Graves (guitarist) (1958 - 1990), also known as Rob Ritter, an American bass and guitar player who was a member of The Gun Club
 Rob Graves (born 1973), an American guitarist and Music Producer, known for his work with Red